Ferran Tacón Jiménez  (born 18 September 1986 in Mataró, Barcelona, Catalonia) is a Spanish footballer who plays as a midfielder for CF Caldes de Montbui.

External links

1986 births
Living people
People from Mataró
Sportspeople from the Province of Barcelona
Spanish footballers
Footballers from Catalonia
Association football midfielders
Segunda División players
Segunda División B players
Tercera División players
Divisiones Regionales de Fútbol players
Real Madrid C footballers
RCD Espanyol B footballers
CD Logroñés footballers
Celta de Vigo B players
RC Celta de Vigo players
Cultural Leonesa footballers
CD Leganés players
CD Tenerife players
CD Alcoyano footballers
CF Badalona players
La Roda CF players
CD Eldense footballers
CD Masnou players
UA Horta players
FC Andorra players
UDA Gramenet footballers
Liga Portugal 2 players
C.F. União players
Oman Professional League players
Al-Nasr SC (Salalah) players
Spanish expatriate footballers
Expatriate footballers in Portugal
Expatriate footballers in Oman
Expatriate footballers in Andorra
Spanish expatriate sportspeople in Portugal
Spanish expatriate sportspeople in Oman
Spanish expatriate sportspeople in Andorra